Cedar Pond is a reservoir in West Milford, New Jersey.

See also
Cedar Lake, New Jersey

References

Reservoirs in New Jersey
West Milford, New Jersey